William Ratliff (1937 - April 11, 2014) was a research fellow and curator of Americas Collection at Stanford University's Hoover Institution, specializing in Latin America, China and U.S. foreign policy. He was also a research fellow of the Independent Institute and wrote on the economic and political development in East/Southeast Asia and Latin America. For over 20 years he was the editor for the Yearbook on International Communist Affairs and the Journal of Interamerican Studies. He testified before the U.S. Congress on his work monitoring elections around Latin America.

Background 
Ratliff graduated from Oberlin College and received his M.A. and Ph.D (in Chinese/Latin American histories) from the University of Washington.  He taught at Stanford University, San Francisco State University, University of San Francisco, Tunghai University in Taiwan and Diplomatic Academy at Lake Tahoe.

Ratliff wrote in a number of newspapers including the Los Angeles Times, Foreign Affairs, the Wall Street Journal, The New York Times, Chicago Tribune, Washington Post, El Mercurio (in Santiago, Chile), The Globe and Mail and the American Chronicle.  Ratliff also appeared on the PBS's NewsHour with Jim Lehrer, on CNN, NPR,the  BBC, Voice of America and Radio Marti.

References

External links 
 Articles by William Ratliff, at the Hoover Institution.
 William Ratliff's profile, a collection of Amazon reviews.

Hoover Institution people
1937 births
2014 deaths
Oberlin College alumni
University of Washington College of Arts and Sciences alumni
Stanford University faculty
University of San Francisco faculty
San Francisco State University faculty